The Farman F.60 Goliath was a French airliner and bomber produced by the Farman Aviation Works from 1919. It was instrumental in the creation of early airlines and commercial routes in Europe after World War I.

Design and development
It was a fixed-undercarriage three-bay biplane of fabric-covered wood construction, powered by two Salmson 9Z engines. It had a simple and robust, yet light structure. The wings were rectangular with a constant profile with aerodynamically balanced ailerons fitted to both upper and lower wings.

It was undergoing initial testing when World War I came to an end and Farman realized there would be no orders for his design. Nonetheless he was quick to understand that the big, box-like fuselage of the Goliath could be easily modified to convert the aircraft into an airliner. Commercial aviation was beginning to be developed and was in need of purpose-built aircraft. With the new passenger cabin arrangement, the Goliath could carry up to 12 or 14 passengers. It had large windows to give the passengers a view of the surroundings. The Salmson engines could be replaced by other types (Renault, Lorraine) if a customer desired it. Approximately 60 F.60 Goliaths were built. Between 1927 and 1929, eight Goliaths with various engines were built under licence in Czechoslovakia, four by Avia and four by Letov.

Operational history

Farman was quick to press the Goliath into service and made several publicity flights. On 8 February 1919, the Goliath flew 12 passengers from Toussus-le-Noble to RAF Kenley, near Croydon. Since non-military flying was not permitted at that date, Lucien Bossoutrot and his passengers were all ex-military pilots who wore uniforms and carried mission orders for the circumstances. The flight went well, taking 2 hours and 30 minutes. The pilot and passengers were well received in England. The return flight was made the following day and took 2 hours and 10 minutes.

Other flights were made to publicize the Goliath. On 3 April 1919, 14 passengers were flown to an altitude of 6,200 m (20,341 ft).

Airlines, emerging very rapidly all over Europe, were quick to acquire the F.60. In  1920, the Compagnie des Grands Express Aériens (CGEA) began scheduling regular flights between Le Bourget and Croydon. The Compagnie des Messageries Aériennes (CMA) soon followed suit. The Société Générale de Transports Aériens (SGTA) opened a Paris-Brussels route in July 1920, flown by the Goliath. In May 1921, this route was extended to Amsterdam. The Belgian airline Société Nationale pour l'Etude des Transports Aériens (SNETA) also opened a Brussels-London route in April 1921.

Variants
FF.60 Designation of the first three prototypes.

F.60 Civil passenger transport version, powered by two  Salmson CM.9 radial piston engines, sixty built.

F.60bis This designation was given to the transport version, powered by two  Salmson 9Az engines.

F.60 Bn.2 Three-seat night bomber evolved from the F.60 Goliath. It was equipped with two  Salmson 9Zm engines, and 210 were delivered to French naval and army aviation.

F.60 Torp Torpedo-bomber floatplane, powered by two Gnome-Rhône 9A Jupiter radial piston engines.

F.60M Blunt-nose version in 1924, powered by two  Renault 12Fy engines.

F.61 Two aircraft equipped with two  Renault 12Fe engines.

F.62A record-breaking aircraft, derived from the F.60, powered by a single  Farman 12We. First flown on 7 August 1925, the F.62, piloted by Landry and Drouhin, broke the world record  closed-circuit in 45 hours 11 minutes and 59 seconds.

F.62 BN.4 Export version for the Soviet Union, powered by two  Lorraine-Dietrich V-12 engines.

F.62 BN.5 A 5-seat night bomber version, powered by 2x  Lorraine 12Db engines.

F.63 BN.4 Similar to the F.62 BN.4 export version, powered by two  Gnome-Rhône 9A Jupiter radial piston engines, 42 built for the Aéronautique militaire francaise.

F.63bisA single airliner, powered by 2x  Armstrong Siddeley Jaguar IIIA engines. Ten more were built powered by 2x  Gnome-Rhône 9Aa Jupiter engines.

F.63ter Three airliners, powered by 2x  Gnome-Rhône 9Aa Jupiter engines.

F.65Sixty floatplane torpedo-bombers built for the  Aéronautique navale, fitted with interchangeable float or landing gear and powered by 2x  Gnome-Rhône 9Aa Jupiter engines.

F.66 Two torpedo-bombers built for the  Aéronautique navale, powered by 2x  Salmson CM.9 engines.

F.66 BN.3 One Gnome-Rhône 9A Jupiter-powered aircraft was built, intended to be exported to Romania.

F.68 BN.4 Thirty-two bomber aircraft, powered by 2x  Gnome-Rhône 9Ab Jupiter, exported to Poland.

F.140 Super Goliath Super-heavy bomber prototype, powered by four  Farman 12We W-12 engines in tandem pairs.

Operators

Civilian operators

Sociéte Anonyme Belge pour l'Exploitation de la Navigation Aérienne (SABENA).
Société Colombophile de Transport Aériens (SOCTA).
Syndicat National pour l'Etude des Transports Aérienne (SNETA).

Compañía Colombiana de Navegación Aérea (CCNA)

Československé státní aerolinie (ČSA).

Air Union.
Compagnie Aérienne Française (CAF).
Compagnie des Grands Express Aériens (CGEA).
Compagnie des Messageries Aériennes (CMA).
Enterprise de la Photo-Aérienne.
Farman Airlines (Société Générale des Transports Aériens, SGTA).

Liniile Aeriene Române Exploatate de Stat (LARES).

Military operators

Belgian Air Force

Czechoslovak Air Force

French Air Force
French Navy
Commission d'Etudes Pratiques d'Aéronautique (CEPA).
Escadrille 2R1.
Escadrille 5B2.

Peruvian Air Force
Peruvian Navy

Polish Air Force
211 Squadron.
212 Squadron.

Soviet Air Force (4 bought in 1924)

Aeronáutica Militar, used in air raids over Morocco.

Accidents and incidents
26 August 1921Farman F.60 Goliath O-BLAN of SNETA ditched into the English Channel whilst on a flight from Brussels-Evere Airport to Croydon Airport, Surrey, United Kingdom; both pilots were never found. The aircraft was salvaged and rebuilt as an F.61.

27 September 1921 Two Farman F.60 Goliaths, O-BLEU and O-BRUN, both of SNETA, were destroyed in a hangar fire at Brussels-Evere Airport.

8 October 1921 A Farman Goliath of Compagnie des Grands Express Aériens (CGEA) made an emergency landing at Saint-Inglevert, Pas-de-Calais due to problems with a propeller shortly after the aircraft had crossed the French coast. The aircraft was operating an international scheduled passenger flight from Le Bourget Airport, Paris to Croydon. Another aircraft was dispatched from Paris to take the six passengers on to Croydon.

30 November 1921 Farman F.60 Goliath F-GEAD of CGEA was damaged in a forced landing at Smeeth, Kent. The aircraft was repaired and returned to service.

11 February 1922 Farman F.60 Goliath F-GEAI of CGEA was damaged in a forced landing at Farnborough, Kent. The aircraft was repaired and returned to service.

7 April 1922 Farman F.60 Goliath F-GEAD of CGEA was in a mid-air collision with de Havilland DH.18A G-EAWO of Daimler Airway over Thieuloy-Saint-Antoine, Oise, France. All seven people on board both aircraft were killed.

1 September 1922 A Farman F.60 Goliath on a flight from Croydon Airport to Paris, suffered a severely damaged propeller after flying through torrential rain whilst crossing the English Channel. The engine was shut down and a precautionary landing was made at Saint-Inglevert where the propeller was changed in 15 minutes. The aircraft then departed for Le Bourget, where arrival was only 12 minutes later than scheduled.

15 March 1923 Farman F.61 Goliath F-AEIE (former O-BLAN) of Compagnie des Messageries Aériennes (CMA) overran the runway on landing at Croydon and collided with a building. The aircraft was later repaired and returned to service.

7 May 1923 Farman F.60 Goliath F-AEGP Flandre of Air Union was damaged in a forced landing at Lympne, Kent. The aircraft was repaired and returned to service.

14 May 1923 Farman F.60 Goliath F-AEBY of Air Union crashed at Monsures, Somme, following structural failure of a wing. All six people on board were killed. The aircraft was on a scheduled international passenger flight from Paris to Croydon

15 July 1923 Farman F.60 Goliath F-AEEE of Farman crashed near Valenciennes, France.

27 August 1923 Farman F.60 Goliath (former F.61) F-AECB of Air Union crashed at East Malling, Kent. The aircraft was operating an international scheduled passenger flight from Paris to Croydon. A precautionary landing was made at Lympne due to weather, following which the flight was resumed. One engine later failed and the aircraft crashed following misunderstanding of an instruction for a number of passengers to move towards the rear of the aircraft, affecting the centre of gravity and causing the aircraft to enter a spin.

3 December 1923Farman F.60 Goliath F-AEIF, possibly operated by CMA, crashed at Littlestone, Kent.

22 January 1924Farman F.60 Goliath F-GEAO of Air Union was destroyed by fire following an accident when landing at Croydon.

6 August 1924 Farman F.60 Goliath F-ADDT Languedoc of Air Union was on a scheduled international passenger flight from Paris to Croydon when the port engine failed. A forced landing was made at Golden Green, Kent. One person amongst the pilot and five passengers on board was injured. The aircraft was dismantled to allow removal. It was later repaired and returned to service.

8 February 1925Farman F.60 Goliath F-GEAB Savoie of Air Union crashed whilst attempting to land at Lympne. The aircraft was on a cargo flight from Paris to Croydon when an engine failed over the Channel. The aircraft was later repaired and returned to service.

16 October 1925Farman F.60 Goliath F-HMFU Île de France of Air Union crashed at Wadhurst, East Sussex. Three passengers were killed and two were injured. The aircraft may have been repaired and returned to service as its registration was not cancelled until 1 June 1932. Its fuselage is preserved.

The aircraft was salvaged and rebuilt as an F.63bis, returning to service in 1929.

10 March 1927Farman F.63bis Goliath F-AEGP Flandre of Air Union made a forced landing near Tonbridge, Kent following an engine failure.

5 May 1927Farman F.61 Goliath F-ADFN of Société Générale des Transports Aériens was lost in the Atlantic Ocean on a flight from Saint-Louis Senegal to Pernambuco, Brazil. Both crew were killed.

24 November 1927Farman F.60 Goliath F-GEAB Savoie of Air Union was severely damaged in a forced landing at Yaldham Manor, Wrotham, Kent. The aircraft was later repaired and returned to service.

6 March 1928Farman F.60 Goliath (former F.61) F-AECU Normandie of Air Union crashed at Hythe, Kent. The aircraft may have been repaired and returned to service as its registration was not cancelled until 1 June 1932.

The aircraft had landed at Saint-Inglevert to await an improvement in the weather before continuing its journey, and the passenger (or passengers) had decided to continue the journey by boat. The aircraft broadcast a Mayday before it crashed into the sea, killing both crew. The bodies of the victims were picked up the Southern Railway's ferry .

23 May 1928Farman F.63bis Goliath F-AEIE of Société Générale des Transports Aériens (SGTA) crashed on take-off from Cologne, Germany and was destroyed by fire. Three people were killed.

19 May 1929 Farman F.60 Goliath F-GEAI Vendee of Air Union, on a flight from Croydon to Paris crashed at Keylands Sidings near Paddock Wood railway station, it stopped yards from the signal box and was destroyed by fire, the pilot and mechanic escaped with minor injuries.

31 July 1929Farman F.60 Goliath F-GEAB Savoie of Air Union, on a flight from London to Paris carrying gold bullion was damaged in a forced landing near Smarden in Kent, bushes on the riverbank stopped the aircraft entering the River Beult although some of the gold bullion it was carrying ended up in the river. The bullion was recovered by spectators and transferred by lorry to Lympne for onward transport to Paris. The aircraft may have been repaired and returned to service as its registration was not cancelled until 1 June 1932.

October 1929 Farman F.63bis Goliath F-FARI of Societe Generale de Transports Aeriens (SGEA) was destroyed in an accident.

10 February 1930Farman F.63bis Goliath F-FHMY Picardie of Air Union crashed at Marden Airfield, Kent following failure of the starboard tailplane. Two passengers killed of the six people on board.

2 May 1930 Farman F.63bis Goliath F-ADCA Lorraine of Air Union crashed at Penshurst, Kent after encountering a heavy squall whilst on a flight from Le Bourget, Paris to Croydon.

23 April 1931 Farman F.63 Goliath F-ADDT Languedoc of Air Union crashed at Widehurst Farm, Marden after taking off from Marden. The aircraft was carrying mail.

9 July 1930 Farman F.60 F-ADFQ of the SGTA crashed near Aalsmeer shortly after takeoff from Amsterdam. One crew member, a mechanic, died shortly after. The pilot and the marconist escaped with slight injuries. The plane was a total loss.

Survivors
No complete airframe survives. The forward fuselage of F-HMFU is exhibited at the Musée de l'Air et de l'Espace, Le Bourget, France.

Specifications (F.63 BN.4)

See also
Farman F.140 Super Goliath

References

Bibliography

Further reading

External links

  
Farman Goliath
Farman Goliath webpage 
Le "Goliath" Farman . Detailed account by an enthusiast of the history of individual F.60s.

1910s French airliners
1910s French bomber aircraft
F.0060
Aircraft first flown in 1919